Tortured Existence is the debut album by American thrash metal band Demolition Hammer. It was released on February 12, 1991, by Century Media Records.

A music video was made for "Infectious Hospital Waste".

Track listing

Credits

Steve Reynolds – lead vocals, bass
James Reilly – guitar, backing vocals
Derek Sykes – guitar, backing vocals
Vinny Daze – drums, backing vocals

References

1991 albums
Demolition Hammer albums
Century Media Records albums